Dorsey William Burnett Jr. (December 28, 1932 – August 19, 1979) was an American early rockabilly singer. With his younger brother Johnny Burnette and a friend named Paul Burlison, he was a founder member of The Rock and Roll Trio. He is also the father of country musician and former Fleetwood Mac member Billy Burnette.

Background and early career
Dorsey William Burnett Jr. was born on December 28, 1932, to Willie Mae and Dorsey William Burnett, Sr. in Memphis, Tennessee, United States. The 'e' at the end of his surname was added later. John Joseph "Johnny" Burnett, his younger brother, was born on March 25, 1934. The family lived in a public housing project in the Lauderdale Courts area of Memphis, Tennessee.

Dorsey was a competent athlete with an interest in boxing. Both of the Burnette brothers turned out to be successful amateur boxers, becoming local Golden Gloves champions. In 1949, Dorsey was introduced to another young boxing contender named Paul Burlison by Jimmy Denson, his boxing teacher, and they were to become friends. Later, Burlison was introduced to Johnny Burnette, and they also became friends. All three men had a mutual interest in music. Burlison had begun to receive guitar lessons when he was eight years old. In 1939, Dorsey Sr. gave his two sons a pair of Gene Autry guitars. According to most sources, the brothers immediately broke them over each other's head. Dorsey Sr. then bought them two more guitars. Dorsey later recalled that their father had said "Learn to play those guitars. You can be like those folks on the Grand Ole Opry if you want to." Dorsey said that "he learned the G, C and E chords and when the strings broke, he would use baling wire".

After graduating from a Catholic high school in Memphis, Dorsey became a professional boxer before working at a number of daytime jobs, which included a cotton picker, an oiler on a Mississippi riverboat, a fisherman, a carpet layer. He was finally to work at the Crown Electric Company with Paul Burlison as an apprentice electrician and would spend six years studying for an electrician's license. Johnny Burnette also worked as a deck hand on barges, which traversed the Mississippi River and though they worked separately, each of them would bring his guitar on board and write songs during his spare time. After work, they would perform those and other songs together at local bars with a varying array of sidemen. Paul Burlison joined them after his discharge from the United States Armed Forces, and in 1952 or 1953, they formed a group, which may have been called The Rhythm Rangers at the time. Johnny Burnette sang the vocals and played acoustic guitar, Dorsey played bass, and Paul Burlison played lead guitar.

The Rock and Roll Trio
For economic reasons, in 1956, the three young men moved to New York City, where they got an audition with the Ted Mack on Original Amateur Hour. They won the competition three times in a row, which gained them a place in the finals and a recording contract with Coral Records and they officially became The Rock and Roll Trio. Promotional appearances were arranged on Dick Clark's American Bandstand, Steve Allen's Tonight Show and Perry Como's Kraft Music Hall, together with a summer tour with Carl Perkins and Gene Vincent. On September 9, 1956, they appeared as finalists in the Ted Mack Original Amateur Hour at Madison Square Garden. Despite all of this activity, however, the three singles released over this period failed to make the national charts.

To cover their living expenses, the Trio was forced to go on the road. This exhausting regime led to squabbles, which were exacerbated in Dorsey's case by Jerome's use of the name Johnny Burnette and the Rock and Roll Trio on records and live dates. Things finally came to a head at a gig in Niagara Falls in the fall of 1956, when as a result of a fight, Dorsey quit the group a week before they were to appear in Alan Freed's film Rock, Rock, Rock. Johnny Burnette and Paul Burlison recruited Johnny Black, the brother of Elvis Presley's bassist Bill Black, to fill Dorsey's place, and the Trio completed their spot in the film. Despite the film appearance and three more single releases and one LP release, the group failed to achieve any chart success, and the Trio officially disbanded in the fall of 1957.

Move to California
Colin Escott of Showtime Magazine states that during or after his stint with his own trio, Dorsey recorded a demo session with Fabor Robinson (owner of Fabor Records, co-owner of Abbott Records and sometime manager of Johnny Horton and Jim Reeves). French researchers Giles Vignal and Marc Alesina place the demo session at the Sun Records Studio in November 1956, and they have Dorsey's being backed by Johnny Burnette and Paul Burlison. "Let's Fall in Love" and four other tracks were cut, but all are believed to be lost. On November 24, 1956, Dorsey went to a session at the Fabor Studio in Malibu, California, where he cut four tracks: "The Devil Queen", "Let's Fall in Love", "At a Distance" and "Jungle Magic". These tracks were released as two singles: "Let's Fall in Love/The Devil's Queen" (Abbott 188–45) on November 24, 1956 and "Jungle Magic/At a Distance" (Abbott 190–45) on February 23, 1957. Fabor Robinson offered to place Dorsey on either the Louisiana Hayride or the Town Hall Party (the West Coast's leading showcase for country music).

After moving to California, Dorsey found work as an electrician to make ends meet and began writing songs in his spare time. Once he had become settled, Dorsey sent for his family. By the fall of 1957, Johnny Burnette was unemployed, and he tried his luck on the West Coast of the United States. With a friend, Joe Campbell, he hitched a ride in a railroad boxcar to Los Angeles, where they joined Dorsey. With their past differences forgotten, the brothers attempted to resurrect The Rock and Roll Trio by sending for Paul Burlison. He briefly joined them, but returned to Memphis and concentrated on his electrical business. Dorsey continued with his day job as an electrician to pay the family expenses, and he and Johnny continued with their song-writing activities in their spare time.

The Burnette Brothers
In November 1957, the brothers were approached by songwriter John Marascalco, who had written "Ready Teddy" and "Rip It Up" for Little Richard as well as "Good Night My Love". He was looking for a singer to help him with "Bertha Lou", a new song. Dorsey and Johnny went into the Master Recorders Studio in Hollywood and backed by Odell Hull (lead guitar), Danny Flores (piano) and H.B. Barnum (drums) cut two tracks: "Bertha Lou" and "‘Till The Law Says Stop". It originally was planned that Johnny should sing the lead vocals, but when he recalled that he was still under contract to Coral Records, Dorsey suggested that nobody would care if he sang the song. The vocal duties were switched, with Johnny singing some of the backing vocals. The two sides were released as a single (Surf SR5019-45) under Dorsey's name. Coral threatened to sue, and so label owner Kenny Babcock withdrew the record. Babcock had Dorsey's voice overdubbed with that of Johnny Faire (also known as John Faircloth). Surf SR5019-45 was subsequently re-released as by Johnny Faire. Johnny Faire later changed his name and found fame as Donnie Brooks.

The songwriting credits show John Marascalco as the writer of "Bertha Lou", but Cub Koda reports Brooks as saying that the song was in fact written by Johnny Burnette, who, as part of the recording deal, sold it to Marascalo. John Marascalco later was persuaded to release Dorsey's version, which he still owned. In 1965, "Bertha Lou"/"Keep a Knockin’" was released as Cee-Jam No. 6 with "Bertha Lou" under the name of Dorsey Burnette. The flipside "Keep a Knockin’" was released under the name The Brothers. In 1966, "Bertha Lou"/"’Til The Law Says Stop" was released as Cee-Jam No. 16 with both sides under the name Dorsey Burnette.

It was sheer bravado that enabled the Burnette Brothers to have their first major breakthrough as songwriters. On arriving in Los Angeles, Joe Campbell bought a copy of "A Map to the Stars", which showed the location of the then teen idol Ricky Nelson's home. In an effort to get their songs to him, the Burnettes and Campbell sat on the steps of the star's home until they could get a meeting with him. This persistence worked, and Nelson was impressed with their work, and he recorded "Believe What You Say", "It's Late" and "Waitin' in School". Other artists on Imperial Records, Nelson's label, such as Roy Brown, who covered the brothers' "Hip Shakin' Baby", benefited from their songwriting abilities, and this led to their signing a recording contract with Imperial.

As the Burnette Brothers, Dorsey and Johnny had a single release on the Imperial label, "Warm Love"/"My Honey" (Imperial X5509), released on May 5, 1958. It did not make the charts. In 1961, they had two instrumentals releases on the small Infinity and Gothic labels. The first single "Green Grass of Texas"/"Bloody River" (Infinity INX-001) was released on February 20, 1961. The second single "Rockin' Johnny Home"/"Ole Reb" (Gothic GOX-001) was released on May 29, 1961. Both singles were released under the name The Texans. Another instrumental, "Lonely Island"/"Green Hills" (Liberty 55460), under the name The Shamrocks, appeared on Liberty Records on June 6, 1962. "Green Grass of Texas"/"Bloody River" was re-released in February 1965 on the Vee-Jay label (VJ 658), again under the name of The Texans.

Solo career

Pop years
Dorsey Burnette had two single releases while contracted to Imperial Records as a solo artist: "You Came as a Miracle"/"Try" (Imperial X5561), released on March 9, 1959, and "Lonely Train"/"Misery" (Imperial X 5597), released on September 7, 1959. Neither record was a hit. In late 1959, Dorsey offered "Tall Oak Tree" to Ricky Nelson, who turned it down. Now signed to Era Records, Dorsey recorded the song himself, and it was released on January 11, 1960 backed with "Juarez Town" (Era 3012). The record entered the charts and reached No. 23 on the Hot 100. He was the first of the Burnette Brothers to have a hit record. This success spurred Coral Records to dig into their archives and release two old Rock and Roll Trio recordings as "Blues Stay Away from Me"/"Midnight Train" (Coral 9–62190). The top side was released under the name Dorsey Burnette, but the flip side was under the names Dorsey and Johnny Burnette. It did not make the charts. On May 2, 1960, Era released a follow-up record, "Hey Little One"/"Big Rock Candy Mountain" (Era 3019), by Dorsey and it reached No. 48 in the Hot 100. Two days later on May 4, 1960, "Dreamin’", Johnny Burnette's first major solo hit record, was released on Liberty Records. On May 23, 1960, Imperial Records followed Coral's example and released "Way in the Middle of the Night"/"Your Love" (Imperial X 5668) under the name Dorsey Burnette, but it failed to make the charts.

"The Ghost of Billy Malloo"/"Red Roses" (Era 3025), Dorsey Burnette's third single on the Era Label, was released on August 29, 1960 but unlike its predecessors, it failed to enter the charts. His final release for the Era label that year was "This Hotel"/"The River and the Mountain" (Era 3033), released on November 7, 1960, but it also failed to become a hit. In 1961, he had two single releases on Era Records: "Hard Rock Mine"/"(It's No) Sin" (Era 3041), released February 27, 1961, and "Great Shakin' Fever"/"That's Me Without You" (Era 3045) released April 24, 1961. These singles failed to become hits, and in May 1961, Herb Newman of Era Records sold Dorsey's contract together with the masters of his last two Era recording sessions to Dot Records (its biggest recording artist at that time was Pat Boone). 

Dorsey had three singles released during his time with Dot. The first was "Rainin'"/"A Full House" (Dot 45–16230), released May 1961; followed by "Feminine Touch"/"Sad Boy" (Dot 45–16265), released September 25, 1961; and finally "Dying Ember"/"A Country Boy in the Army" (Dot 45–16305) released January 1962. None of these releases caught the public's ear, and he was released at the end of his six-month contract. From here, he moved to Reprise Records, the label owned at that time by Frank Sinatra. At Reprise, Dorsey worked with producer Jimmy Bowen and arranger Jack Nitzsche and had two single releases in 1962. "Castle in the Sky"/"The Boys Kept Hangin' Around" (Reprise R-20,093) was released on June 30, 1962, and "I'm Waitin' for Ya Baby"/"Darling Jane" (Reprise R-20,121) was released October 27, 1962. Neither single was a hit. During 1963, he had four singles releases on Reprise. The first was "Foolish Pride"/"Four For Texas" (Reprise R-20,146) released February 23, 1963; followed by "Hey Sue"/"It Don't Take Much" (Reprise R-20,153), released March 9, 1963; then "Invisible Chains/Pebbles" (Reprise R-20,177), released May 9, 1963. His final release was "Where's the Lonely Girl?"/"One of the Lonely" (Reprise R-20,208) released August 24, 1963. To coincide with this single, Imperial released "Circle Rock"/"House with a Tin Roof Top" (Imperial 5987) in August 1963. None of these singles reached the charts, and so he moved to the Mel-O-Dy label, a subsidiary of Motown Records. The label's early releases were soul-oriented and included tracks by Lamont Dozier, The Vells (Martha and the Vandellas) and The Pirates (The Temptations).

The single "The Greatest Love"/"Thin Little, Simple Little, Plain Little Girl" (Liberty 56087) was released in late 1968 and was in "hitbound" status on some radio stations as of December 25, 1968.

Johnny Burnette's death
Three months later Dorsey Burnette suffered a family tragedy from which, according to most sources, he never fully recovered. On August 14, 1964, his brother Johnny had gone on a fishing trip on Clear Lake, California. After dark, his tiny, unlit fishing boat was struck by an unaware cabin cruiser, and the impact threw him into the lake where he drowned. Dorsey was distraught, and he telephoned Paul Burlison, who immediately flew to comfort him. The two men renewed their friendship, and Johnny Burnette was interred in Forest Lawn Memorial Park in Glendale, California. His last two Mel-O-Dy singles, "Jimmy Brown"/"Everybody's Angel" (Mel-O-Dy 116) released October 1964 and "Long Long Time Ago"/"Ever Since the World Began" (Mel-O-Dy 118), released in November 1964, failed to make the charts. The label was discontinued in April 1965, and from then on, Dorsey recorded without luck on a series of labels, including Liberty, Merri, Happy Tiger, Music Factory, Smash (where he re-recorded "Tall Oak Tree"), Mercury, Hickory and Condor, which released "The Magnificent Sanctuary Band"/"Can't You See It Happening" (Condor FF-1005) on February 7, 1970.

Country years
By the 1970s Dorsey had become a born-again Christian and had returned to country material. He found success on the country charts with self-penned songs such as "In the Spring (The Roses Always Turn Red)" (Capitol 3307; 1972; No. 21), "I Just Couldn't Let Her Walk Away" (Capitol 3404; 1972; No. 40), "Darlin’" (Capitol 3678; 1973; No. 26), "Molly (I Ain't Getting' Any Younger)" (Melodyland 6007: 1975; No. 28) and "Things I Treasure" (Calliope 8004; 1977; No. 31). He was voted Most Promising Newcomer by the Academy of Country Music in 1973, and in all, he had 15 country hits, but none made the top 20.

Films
During the 1970s, Dorsey turned to the big screen. In 1974, he was credited with writing the songs for the film Bootleggers (also known as Bootleggers Angel). In 1976, he helped compose the music, with Mike Curb and Duane Eddy, for Dixie Dynamite. In 1977, he was credited as the composer of the original music for the soundtrack of the horror movie Kingdom of the Spiders. In 1978, he was credited with singing the title song of the movie My Boys Are Good Boys as well as co-writing the song in collaboration with Doug Goodwin.

Death
In 1979, he signed with Elektra/Asylum label. Just after his first record release, however, he died of a massive heart attack at his home in Canoga Park, California on August 19, 1979, aged 46. He is interred at Forest Lawn Memorial Park Cemetery in Glendale, California.

Final public performance
Dorsey last appeared in public on August 18, 1979 at The Performing Arts Center in Oxnard, California. He played a half-hour show at a benefit for the Arthritis Foundation the day before he died.

Patrick Landreville, who played the final show with Dorsey, statedMost people that play benefits for national or international charities get paid for their performances, at the least their expenses are paid. But Dorsey and I choose to play for free at these affairs, though neither one of us is well off financially. Dorsey is a legendary figure in music and could command a hefty sum for his services but he's chosen to give, not to take. I'm proud to know him and to have had the opportunity to make music with him and I'm especially proud that he considers me his peer.

Legacy
After his death, singer and friend Delaney Bramlett organized a benefit concert for Dorsey Burnette's widow at The Forum in Inglewood, California, where Kris Kristofferson, Hoyt Axton, Tanya Tucker, Glen Campbell, Edward James Olmos, Duane Eddy, Delaney and Bonnie, Gary Busey, Maureen McGovern and Roger Miller appeared. Burnette's pioneering contribution to the genre has been recognized by the Rockabilly Hall of Fame.

Discography

Albums

Singles

References

External links
 
 
 
 
 Johnny Burnette's Rock 'n' Roll Trio – general info.
 Motown Records by LG Nilsson – For details of Mel-O-Dy Records and its artists
 
 Survey of American Popular Music by Frank Hoffmann – Dorsey and Johnny Burnette

1932 births
1979 deaths
American country singer-songwriters
American rockabilly musicians
Slap bassists (double bass)
Musicians from Memphis, Tennessee
Singer-songwriters from Tennessee
Burials at Forest Lawn Memorial Park (Glendale)
Abbott Records artists
Era Records artists
Imperial Records artists
Motown artists
Smash Records artists
People from Canoga Park, Los Angeles
20th-century American singers
Country musicians from Tennessee
20th-century double-bassists